Angus Harrison is from Bristol, England.  He has appeared in the show Skins.

References

External links 
 

Male actors from Bristol
Living people
1992 births